Georgios Fotou (born 5 July 1969) is a Greek rower. He competed in the men's coxless four event at the 1988 Summer Olympics.

References

1969 births
Living people
Greek male rowers
Olympic rowers of Greece
Rowers at the 1988 Summer Olympics
Place of birth missing (living people)